Compsolechia orthophracta is a moth of the family Gelechiidae. It was described by Edward Meyrick in 1914. It is found in Guyana.

The wingspan is about 12 mm. The forewings are dark fuscous with four dark blue-leaden direct transverse fasciae, the first narrow and basal, sometimes connected with the second on the dorsum, the second at one-third is broad, the third postmedian and broad, the fourth from four-fifths of the costa to the tornus is narrow. There is a slender blue-leaden streak along the termen. The hindwings are dark fuscous.

References

Moths described in 1914
Compsolechia
Taxa named by Edward Meyrick